Kent Cooper (March 22, 1880 – January 31, 1965) served with the Associated Press (AP) for 41 years, last as executive director.

Background
Kent Cooper was born on March 22, 1880, in Columbus, Indiana; his father was Democratic U.S. Congressman George W. Cooper.

Career
His father's early death led Cooper to turn his after-school job as reporter for a local newspaper into a full-time job. He became a reporter for the Indianapolis Press newspaper. He joined the Scripps-McRae Press Association (later United Press), established his own news agency, and then returned to Scripps-McRae in a buy-out.

In 1910, Melville Stone, editor of the Associated Press, hired him as traveling inspector. In 1912, he was promoted to chief of traffic. In 1920, he was promoted to assistant general manager. In 1920, he became general manager.

In the late 1920s, Cooper hired AP's first class of women reporters, including Marguerite Young, who later, as Washington bureau chief for the Daily Worker, would introduce Soviet spy Hede Massing to American diplomat Noel Field.

Innovations introduced under his stewardship include use of the first high-speed telegraph printing machines, use of teletype (instead of Morse Code), and introduction of a photograph wire service (by 1935, known as World Wide Photos). By 1929, he had also opened bureaus in London, Paris, and Berlin.

During his 41 years with AP, Cooper's positions included general manager (1925–1943) and finally executive director.

Personal and death

In 1920, Cooper married Marian Rothwell; they divorced in 1940.

On January 31, 1965, he died in West Palm Beach, Florida. He is buried in Sleepy Hollow Cemetery, Sleepy Hollow, New York.

Legacy
Cooper Glacier in Antarctica is named for him.

Awards
In 1941, Cooper received an honorary degree from Indiana University.

Works

Cooper coined the term "the right to know" with publication of his book The Right to Know (1956).

Books:
 Barriers Down (1942)
 Anna Zenger, Mother of Freedom (1946)
 The Minnesota Strip (1949)
 The Right to Know (1956)
 Kent Cooper and the Associated Press: An Autobiography (New York: Random House, 1958)

Articles:
 "The Future of the AP" (December 1943)

See also
 United Press
 Associated Press
 Marguerite Young

References

External links
 

1880 births
1965 deaths
American male journalists
Burials at Sleepy Hollow Cemetery
Associated Press people